Deep River Friends Meeting House and Cemetery is a historic Quaker (Society of Friends) meeting house and cemetery located at 5300 W. Wendover Avenue in High Point, Guilford County, North Carolina.  The meeting house was built in 1874–1875, and is a rectangular brick building with Italianate style design elements.  Also on the property are the contributing "Uppin' Blocks" (1830), cemetery, school house marker (1932), and first meeting house marker (1934).

It was listed on the National Register of Historic Places in 1995.

References

Further reading

 

Churches in High Point, North Carolina
Quaker cemeteries
Quaker meeting houses in North Carolina
Italianate architecture in North Carolina
Churches completed in 1875
Cemeteries in North Carolina
Churches on the National Register of Historic Places in North Carolina
National Register of Historic Places in Guilford County, North Carolina